"Heal the Pain" is a song written and performed by British singer-songwriter George Michael and released on Epic Records in February 1991. A contemplative, acoustic guitar-based love song, it was the fourth of five UK singles taken from his second solo album, Listen Without Prejudice Vol. 1 (1990).

The song entered the UK Singles Chart in February 1991 and peaked at number 31. It followed a pattern of being slightly lower than its predecessor (the previous three singles had peaked at numbers 6, 23 and 28, respectively). One more single from the album would continue the pattern, by not even breaking the threshold of the top 40. "Soul Free", also taken from Listen Without Prejudice Vol. 1, appeared as the B-side. For the fourth US single, Columbia Records used "Soul Free" as the A-side and "Cowboys and Angels" as the B-side, but the single did not chart.

The band Lemon Jelly have used an uncredited sample of the track on the B-side of their single "Rolled/Oats". Brazilian singers Fernanda Takai and Samuel Rosa recorded a version of the song in Portuguese titled Pra Curar Essa Dor, for Takai's fourth studio album, Na Medida do Impossível, released in 2014.

Critical reception
Adam Sweeting from The Guardian named "Heal the Pain" one of the "best tracks" of Listen Without Prejudice Vol. 1. He added that the song "with its close harmonies and neck-brushing acoustic guitars, is the Paul McCartney ballad the Fab One never wrote."

Charts

2006 version

In 2005, it was announced that Michael would be recording a version of the track with Paul McCartney, in whose style the song was written. Michael appeared on the Chris Evans show on BBC Radio 2 on 5 December 2005, and announced that he had recorded the song with McCartney "last week" but did not know what he was going to do with it yet. The track was later added to the greatest hits collection Twenty Five.

In 2008, it was released as a single from the US release of George Michael's greatest hits album Twenty Five.

References

External links
 
 

George Michael songs
1991 singles
2008 singles
Songs written by George Michael
Song recordings produced by George Michael
Pop ballads
Epic Records singles
1990 songs